I Was Monty's Double (titled Hell, Heaven or Hoboken in the U.S.) is a 1958 film produced by the Associated British Picture Corporation and directed by John Guillermin. The screenplay was adapted by Bryan Forbes from the autobiography of M. E. Clifton James, an actor who pretended to be General Bernard Montgomery as a decoy during World War II.

Plot
A few months before the D-Day landings during World War II, the British government launches a misinformation campaign, spreading a rumour that the landings might occur at a location other than Normandy. The details of the operation are handed to two intelligence officers, Colonel Logan and Major Harvey. They are initially unable to devise such a plan, but one night, Harvey sees an actor at a London theatre performing a convincing impression of General Bernard Montgomery.

The actor is M. E. Clifton James, a lieutenant stationed in Leicester with the Royal Army Pay Corps and a professional actor during peacetime. He is summoned to London purportedly to test for an army film, and a plan is devised by which he will tour North Africa impersonating Montgomery.

James doubts that he can successfully impersonate Montgomery, but he agrees to try. Disguised as a corporal, he spends time at Montgomery's headquarters and learns to copy the general's mannerisms and style. After an interview with the general, James is dispatched to tour North Africa.

Accompanied by Harvey, who is playing the role of a brigadier and Montgomery's aide-de-camp, James arrives at Gibraltar, where the governor, who has known Montgomery's for years, is astounded by the likeness. To further the deception, local businessman and known German agent Karl Nielson is invited to dinner so that he will learn of and spread the information.

James and Harvey tour North Africa and visit the troops. With only a few days remaining before the landings, it is learned that the Germans have indeed been fooled and have kept many troops in the south, away from Normandy. His job completed, James hides at a heavily guarded villa on the coast.

The Germans have been deceived further than Harvey realises. A team of German commandos are transported by submarine to kidnap Montgomery. They kill his guards and are ready to embark with James, but Harvey learns of the kidnapping and foils it at the last moment. They return quietly to London.

Cast

M. E. Clifton James as himself and General Montgomery
John Mills as Major Harvey
Cecil Parker as Colonel E. F. Logan
Patrick Allen as Colonel Mathers
Patrick Holt as Colonel Dawson
Leslie Phillips as Major Tennant
Michael Hordern as Governor of Gibraltar
Marius Goring as Karl Nielson
Barbara Hicks as Hester Baring
Duncan Lamont as Wing Commander Bates
Anthony Sagar as Guard Sergeant
John Gale as Flight Lieutenant Osborne
Kenneth J. Warren as Flying Officer Davies
James Hayter as Sergeant Adams
Sid James as Desk Clerk Y.M.C.A.
MacDonald Parke as American General
John Le Mesurier as disgruntled officer
Vera Day as Angela
George Eugeniou as Garcia 
Patrick Connor as Soldier in Tent (uncredited)
Sam Kydd as Soldier in Cinema
Alfie Bass as man on train
Allan Cuthbertson as Guards Officer

Comparison with book
The film broadly follows the account by James in his book of the same name, but according to James, there was no attempt to kidnap him. The German high command did plan to have him killed, but Hitler vetoed the plan until he could be sure where the landings would actually take place.

Gibraltar was in reality a hotbed of German agents, and James/Montgomery was watched by several operatives who were smuggled into Gibraltar specifically for that purpose. James/Montgomery deliberately talked about nonexistent operations and plans in the hope that the spies would overhear and take his misinformation seriously.

The intelligence officer who initially recruited James was David Niven, who was serving as a lieutenant colonel at the war office.

Production
When James agreed to impersonate Montgomery, he was barred from mentioning it under army regulations. However, after Operation Copperhead was mentioned in the book My Three Years with Eisenhower, James asked for and received permission to write a book, which was published in 1954.

In June 1956, it was announced that the film rights had been purchased by Todon Productions, the company owned by Tony Owen and Donna Reed. Todon wanted Laurence Olivier to play Montgomery and Stephen Watts was assigned to write the treatment. Frederic March was named as another possibility for the lead. In mid-June, it was announced that Clifton James would play himself and Montgomery, with Olivier the leading choice for the other main role. Permission from Montgomery and the war office was conditional upon script approval. A deal was signed with Columbia to distribute.

In August 1956, the film was listed on Todon's slate, which also included Town on Trial, another film directed by John Guillermin and starring John Mills. In September, Michael Rennie was mentioned as a lead. In July 1957, it was announced that Ken Hughes would direct.

Producer Maxwell Setton took the film for Rank, which agreed to finance, but Rank head John Davis wanted Bryan Forbes' script vetted by head of production Earl St. John. Setton then took the project to Robert Clark at the Associated British Picture Corporation (ABPC), and Clark agreed to finance the film.

Setton changed the nationality of Marius Goring's spy character from Spanish to Swedish to enable the unit to film in Gibaltar.

Newsreel footage shows the real Bernard Montgomery in many scenes, but "for a few key moments, James stands in for the real Monty."

In January 1959, ABPC signed a deal with National Telefilm Associates for American distribution of I Was Monty's Double and Ice Cold in Alex in the U.S.

Reception
I Was Monty's Double was a success at the British box office. James embarked on a tour to promote the film.

Variety described the film as "excellently acted and directed....the film has several moments of real tension. Even with a somewhat fictionalized ending, there is a documentary flavor about it which is absorbing. Plenty of-news footage has been woven into the pic and it has been done with commendable ingenuity. Bryan Forbes’ taut screenplay is liberally spiced with humor...James shows himself to be a resourceful actor in his own right... An extraordinary story told convincingly and compellingly."

Film reviewer Stephen Vagg has written that the film is "... splendidly entertaining. The script was written by thespian-turned-scribe Bryan Forbes, and there’s some lovely "actor" character stuff in the film, eg. James thinking he’s being hired for a film role and bringing along a scrapbook of his reviews, James having last-minute nerves, James getting up on stage and worrying about blowing it."

Stephen Watts, who was involved in the real military operation, felt that James "played himself with great skill and distinction."

When Montgomery viewed the film at a London cinema, audiences outside reportedly assumed that he was Clifton James.

In popular culture
I Was Monty's Double inspired a Goon Show episode entitled "I Was Monty's Treble", referring to at least three doppelgängers.

The film was spoofed in the comedy film On the Double, in which Danny Kaye plays a double role.

When the Private Eye comic strip Battle for Britain ended following the 1987 general election, writer Ian Hislop depicted his nom-de-plume Monty Stubble's gravestone with the inscription "I Was Monty Stubble."

See also
 Operation Copperhead

References

Notes

Citations

Bibliography

 Evans, Alun. Brassey's Guide to War Films. Dulles, Virginia: Potomac Books, 2000. .
 Halliwell, Leslie. Leslie Halliwell's Film Guide. New York: Harper & Roe, 1989. .

Further reading
 James, M. E. Clifton. I Was Monty's Double. London: Rider and Co., 1954. .
 MacIntyre, Ben. "Monty's boozy Aussie double fooled Nazi spy." The Australian, 13 March 2010.
 Swainson, Leslie "No Clash of Arms in War Film." The Age, Melbourne, 27 August 1957.

External links
 
 
 
 Was Monty's Double (1959); BFI
Review of film at Variety
 
Complete text of original novel at Internet Archive

1958 films
1958 war films
British war films
British World War II films
World War II films based on actual events
Films directed by John Guillermin
Films scored by John Addison
Films shot in Gibraltar
Cultural depictions of Bernard Montgomery
Films about lookalikes
1950s English-language films
1950s British films